Meghan Kalkstein is an American broadcast journalist for KATU in Portland, Oregon. 
She previously worked at KVAL-TV in Eugene, Oregon (2006–2008) as well as KPIC-TV in Roseburg, Oregon (2005–2006).

Biography

Kalkstein was born in Oakland, California. She attended Bishop O'Dowd High School.  Kalkstein attended the University of California, Davis where she earned her communications degree.  She received a master's degree in Broadcast Journalism from Boston University.

Professional

Kalkstein began her career in Roseburg, Oregon at KPIC-TV in 2005 as a reporter and a producer.  She moved up to KVAL-TV in Eugene, Oregon in 2006 as a reporter, producer, and anchor. She moved to KATU in Portland as a reporter in 2008.  Kalkstein has written for the Sacramento News & Review.

Recognition

Kalkstein was awarded a 1st Place awards by the Associated Press for "Home Invasion" and "Search for Daming Xu", as well as a 3rd Place award for "Buster Keaton" in 2007.

Kalkstein received an Emmy nomination in 2008 for "Tracking Down the General".

References

American television reporters and correspondents
Journalists from Portland, Oregon
University of California, Davis alumni
Boston University College of Communication alumni
Television anchors from Portland, Oregon
Year of birth missing (living people)
Living people